Jamal James Kent is a chef and the winner of the Bocuse d'Or USA 2010. He and his commis Tom Allan went on to represent the U.S. at the international finals of Bocuse d'Or in Lyon, France, in January 2011, where they placed tenth.

In winning the Bocuse d'Or USA contest arranged at the Hyde Park campus of the Culinary Institute of America on February 6, 2010, Kent prepared for the fish dish Scottish "Label Rouge" salmon pavé with leeks, Osetra caviar and Sauce Fumet Blanc, garnished with roulade with Alaskan king crab, relish of cucumber and Meyer lemon, chilled mousse with tartare and roe, pickled heirloom beets with crème fraiche, dill and black pepper. For the meat dish Kent served spring lamb with bacon wrapped saddle with piquillo peppers and provençale herbes, vol-au-vent of braised gigot with sweetbreads and preserved lemon, zucchini with Lynnhaven chèvre frais and mint, tart of tomato confit with basil, niçoise olives and fromage blanc.

Kent currently operates the restaurants Crown Shy and Saga, which are both located in the same building in New York City. As of 2022, Crown Shy holds one star from the Michelin Guide, while Saga holds two stars.

References

Living people
American chefs
American male chefs
Year of birth missing (living people)